Linda Yvonne Knowles (born 28 April 1946) is a retired track and field athlete.

Athletics career
She represented Great Britain in the women's high jump event at the 1964 Summer Olympics in Tokyo, Japan. She won the bronze medal at the 1962 European Championships in Belgrade, Yugoslavia when she was only 16.

She represented England in the high jump at the 1962 British Empire and Commonwealth Games in Perth, Western Australia.

Personal life
She married the Swedish decathlete Lennart Hedmark and now resides in Malmö, Sweden.

References

 
 

1946 births
Living people
English female high jumpers
British female high jumpers
Olympic athletes of Great Britain
Athletes (track and field) at the 1964 Summer Olympics
Commonwealth Games competitors for England
Athletes (track and field) at the 1962 British Empire and Commonwealth Games
European Athletics Championships medalists
Universiade medalists in athletics (track and field)
Universiade silver medalists for Great Britain
Medalists at the 1967 Summer Universiade